Arçay is a commune in the Vienne department in the Nouvelle-Aquitaine region in western France. The inhabitants are called Arçois.

See also
 Communes of the Vienne department

References

Communes of Vienne